The Closerie des Lilas is a famous Parisian restaurant (or "brasserie") located on boulevard du Montparnasse in the 6th arrondissement of Paris.

History 
It was opened in 1847 by Francois Bullier and was a simple brasserie at the beginning. Initially, it was called after a theater piece called « La Closerie des Genets » of Frédéric Soulié. It progressively evolved into the "Closerie des Lilas" because its owner, Bullier, used to plant lilac flowers.

Many artists and intellectuals adopted the habit to spend time there: Émile Zola, Ernest Hemingway, and many others.

Between the two World wars, the restaurant modernized, adopted a style Art-Deco, and became more expensive.

See also 

 Brasserie
 Restaurant 
 Bouillon Chartier
 List of restaurants in Paris

External links 
 http://www.closeriedeslilas.fr/

References 

Buildings and structures in the 6th arrondissement of Paris
Restaurants in Paris
1847 establishments in France